David Kahn or Khan may refer to:

 David Kahn (writer) (born 1930), American historian of cryptography
 David Kahn (sports executive) (born 1961), former president of basketball operations of the Minnesota Timberwolves
 David Khan (politician), Canadian politician
 David Khan (diplomat), Persian ambassador